The Sumathi Best Teledrama Actor Award is presented annually in Sri Lanka by the Sumathi Group of Campany associated with many commercial brands for the best Sri Lankan actor of the year in television screen.

The award was first given in 1995. Following is a list of the winners of this prestigious title since then.

Award winners

References

Actor
Awards for male actors